Miguel del Rey is a Spanish author of military history.  He was the editor of Ristre magazine in its second stage. He has published many books and articles.

Artist Luis Leza Suárez provided the illustrations for Montesa. By this sign conquer; Numancia. Before burnt to charm and Notes on the history of the artillery.

A specialist in uniformology and military flags, del Rey it was director during his second stage —from 2008 to 2010— of the now defunct magazine Ristre of military studies, pioneer in Spain in this matter. He is part of the British Soldier Society, the centenary French association Le Sabretache, the Belgian Society of Figurinists and Military Figures Collectors of America. He has also participated in various cultural projects and exhibitions, advised on television programs and, joined the societies of friends of the vast majority of military museums in Europe —National Army Museum, London; Bayerisches Armeemuseum, Ingolstad; Musée de l'Armée, Paris; Heeresgeschichtliches Museum, Vienna; Hadtorteneti Muzeum, Budapest, etc ...—, collaborated in all the institutional events that they carry out. a member of associations in Spain, France and Great Britain devoted to research in medieval and modern history.

On 5 September 2011 he and coauthor Carlos Canales Torres were awarded the IX Algaba Prize for biography, memoirs and historical research for their essay on sailboat history, Naves mancas. From 2012, he and Torres directed the collection Strokes of history, published by EDAF publishing.

Bibliography

Books (in Spanish) 

 La guerra de África (1859–1860) (Medusa, 2001), 
 La guerra de los diez años (1868–1878) (Ristre Multimedia, 2003), 
 Las Guardias Reales en las campañas de Italia (Ristre, 2008), 
 La guerra de la Oreja de Jenkins (Ristre, 2008), 
 Las reglas del viento. Cara y cruz de la Armada española en el siglo XVI (con Carlos Canales Torres, EDAF, 2010), 
 Breve historia de la guerra del 98 (con Carlos Canales Torres, Nowtilus, 2010), 
 Breve historia de la guerra de Ifni-Sahara (con Carlos Canales Torres, Nowtilus, 2010), 
 Los años de España en México. De Cortés a Prim (con Carlos Canales Torres, EDAF, 2011), 
 La Batalla de Andoain. Ez da kuartelik su ematen dubenentzat (con Carlos Canales Torres, BLS Ediciones 2011), 
 Naves mancas. La armada española a vela de las dunas a Trafalgar (con Carlos Canales Torres, EDAF 2011), 
 Blitzkrieg. La victoria alemana en la guerra relámpago (con Carlos Canales Torres, EDAF, 2012), 
 La palmera y la esvástica. El África Korps (con Carlos Canales Torres, EDAF, 2012), 
 Una jauría de lobos. Submarinos. 1918–1945 (con Carlos Canales Torres, EDAF, 2012), 
 Las garras del águila. El segundo Reich. 1871–1918 (con Carlos Canales Torres, EDAF, 2012), 
 A sangre y fuego. La guerra civil americana (con Carlos Canales Torres, EDAF, 2012), 
 En tierra extraña. Expediciones militares españolas (con Carlos Canales Torres, EDAF, 2012), 
 Arrozales sangrientos. Guerra en Vietnam (con Carlos Canales Torres, EDAF, 2012), 
 Fallschirmjäger. Paracaidistas 1935–1945 (con Carlos Canales Torres, EDAF, 2012), 
 La audacia en la guerra. Comandos 1939–1945 (con Carlos Canales Torres, EDAF, 2013), 
 Abraham Lincoln. La fuerza del destino (con Carlos Canales Torres, EDAF, 2013), 
 Polvo y terror. Las Waffen SS (con Carlos Canales Torres, EDAF, 2013), 
 De madera y acero. El resurgir de la armada española (con Carlos Canales Torres, EDAF, 2013), 
 Ni un paso atrás. Historias olvidadas (con Carlos Canales Torres, EDAF, 2013), 
 Los halcones del mar. La Orden de Malta (con Carlos Canales Torres, EDAF, 2013), 
 David y Goliat. El conflicto árabe-israelí (con Carlos Canales Torres, EDAF, 2013), 
 Exilio en Kabul. La guerra en Afganistán 1813–2013 (con Carlos Canales Torres, EDAF, 2013), 
 Nelson Mandela. El triunfo de la libertad (con Carlos Canales Torres, EDAF, 2013), 
 La Gran Guerra. Grandeza y dolor en las trincheras (con Carlos Canales Torres, EDAF, 2014), 
 Esclavos. Comercio humano en el Atlántico (con Carlos Canales Torres, EDAF, 2014), 
 Valquirias. Mujeres del tercer Reich (con Carlos Canales Torres, EDAF, 2014), 
 La Segunda Guerra Mundial. De las trincheras a la guerra total (con Carlos Canales Torres, EDAF, 2014), 
 Naves Negras (with Carlos Canales Torres, EDAF, 2015, 2021)
 Bernardo de Gálvez (with Carlos Canales Torres, EDAF, 2015)
 Campos de muerte (with Carlos Canales Torres, EDAF, 2016)
 El oro de América (with Carlos Canales Torres, EDAF, 2016)
 De Salamina a las Malvinas (with Carlos Canales Torres, EDAF, 2016)
 Fidel Castro (with Carlos Canales Torres, EDAF, 2016)
 Demonios del Norte (with Carlos Canales Torres, EDAF, 2017)
 El libro del soldado napoleónico (Esfera de los libros, 2017. Translated into portuguese).
 Tormenta roja (with Carlos Canales Torres, EDAF, 2017)
 Cazadores de almas (with Carlos Canales Torres, EDAF, 2017)
 Sahara, la provincia olvidada (with Carlos Canales Torres, EDAF, 2018)
 De Felipe V a Felipe VI (with Carlos Canales Torres and Augusto Ferrer Dalmau illustrations, EDAF, 2018)
 Mandos y generales de la Guerra Civil (with Carlos Canales Torres, EDAF, 2019)
 Mar de viento (with Carlos Canales Torres, EDAF, 2019)
 A tocapenoles (Modus Operandi, 2019) 
 Soldados de fortuna. De los condotieros a Blackwater (with Carlos Canales Torres, EDAF, 2020)
 Atlas de imperios (with Carlos Canales Torres, EDAF, 2020) 
 Gloria imperial. La jornada de Lepanto (with Carlos Canales Torres, EDAF, 2021)
 Atlas histórico de España (with Carlos Canales Torres, EDAF, 2021)
 Napoleón en Egipto (La Esfera de los Libros, 2022)
 Guerreros de Crsito (with Carlos Canales Torres, Almuzara, 2022)
 Infografías del Imperio español (with Carlos Canales Torres, EDAF, 2022)

References

External links 

 
 sevilla.abc.es: The day in which the Spanish Armada defeated Japanese Samurai
 europapress 
 Ateneo de Madrid 
 Me gustan los libros -I love the books-
 es.radio 
 Cadena SER. Interview Prusia
 Inter radio. Interview Fallschirmjäger

1962 births
Living people
Spanish male writers